Sabrina Schmidt Gordon is an American documentary filmmaker. She is known for producing and editing films on cultural and social issues. In 2018, she was invited to become a member of The Academy of Motion Picture Arts and Sciences (AMPAS).

Gordon co-produced and edited DOCUMENTED, a documentary about Jose Antonio Vargas, a journalist and immigration activist. DOCUMENTED was nominated for the 2015 NAACP Image Award for Outstanding Documentary. She won ADIFF 2015's Public Award for the Best Film Directed by a Woman of Color for BaddDDD Sonia Sanchez about poet and activist Sonia Sanchez. It was broadcast on America ReFramed  and nominated for a News & Documentary Emmy Award for Outstanding Arts & Culture Documentary. Other notable filmography include Hip Hop: Beyond Beats and Rhymes, produced with Byron Hurt, and Quest, which was nominated for the 2018 Independent Spirit Award for Best Documentary Feature, the 2019 Peabody Award and the 2019 News and Documentary Emmy Award for Outstanding Documentary and Outstanding Social Issue Documentary.

Gordon graduated from New York University and is an adjunct faculty member at Columbia University.

Filmography 

 Hip Hop: Beyond Beats and Rhymes
 Mrs. Goundo's Daughter
 DOCUMENTED
 BaddDDD Sonia Sanchez
 Quest
 To the End

References/Notes and references

External links
 
 

American documentary film producers
American women documentary filmmakers
Documentary film editors
Living people
Year of birth missing (living people)